Hastings Hill is a suburb of Sunderland, Tyne and Wear, England.

Hastings Hill is a housing estate, close to the A19, and the Pennywell and Grindon areas of Sunderland. It was built as a private development in the late 1960s on an area of land between the county borough boundary and the surrounding post war council-built estates. The estate stands close to Hasting Hill, where a burial ground used by prehistoric man in about 2,000BC was excavated in 1911. Several cists were discovered during the excavation, with one containing the remains of a man, a flint knife and an earthenware food vessel.

City of Sunderland suburbs
Scheduled monuments in Tyne and Wear
Bronze Age sites in Tyne and Wear
Sunderland